Fuwa (written: 不破) is a Japanese surname. Notable people with the surname include:

, Japanese sprinter
, Japanese samurai
, Japanese communist politician

Fictional characters
, a character in the manga series Assassination Classroom
, a character in the tokusatsu series Kamen Rider Zero-One
, a character in the series Delicious Party Pretty Cure

Japanese-language surnames